Kizhskiy Strait is a strait in northwestern Russia (Republic of Karelia), located at , separating the islands Kizhskiye Shkery and the Zaonezhye Peninsula.

It connects the Bolshoye Onego Bay (Lake Onega) in the south-west with the Maloye Onego Bay in the north-east. It is 20 km long and 0.1–1.5 km wide.

Sources 
 Map of strait

Straits of Russia
Bodies of water of the Republic of Karelia